Åre railway station is a railway station located at Åre in Åre Municipality, Sweden on the Mittbanan railway. The first station building was opened in 1881 and designed by Adolf W. Edelsvärd. In 2006 a new station building was opened some hundred metres east of the old, just months before the FIS Alpine World Ski Championships 2007 started.

Railway stations in Jämtland County
Railway stations opened in 1881
1881 establishments in Sweden